Babruysk District (Bobruysk raion) is a raion (district) in Mogilev Region, Belarus. The administrative center is the city of Babruysk. As of 2009, its population was 20,660.

Notable residents 
Vincent Dunin-Marcinkievič (c. 1808–1884), one of the founders of the modern Belarusian literary tradition and national school theatre.

See also
Hančaroŭka

References

 
Districts of Mogilev Region